On 13 June 2022, an artillery attack reportedly hit a marketplace in Donetsk, capital of the self-proclaimed Donetsk People's Republic, killing five people, according to pro-Russian separatist officials.

The attack happened at the Maisky Market in the central part of the city, starting a fire. The pro-Russian Donetsk News Agency claimed the munitions used were "155-mm-calibre NATO-standard artillery munitions." According to separatist officials, five civilians were killed, including a child, and at least 22 were left injured.

The DPR accused Ukraine of perpetrating the shelling attack, to which Ukraine has not yet responded. Local separatist authorities said that the attack had followed an alleged campaign of shelling in the city by the Ukrainian Armed Forces, which had also hit a hospital.

See also
 March 2022 Donetsk attack
 September 2022 Donetsk attack

References

June 2022 events in Ukraine
June 2022 crimes in Europe
2022 fires in Europe
Mass murder in 2022
Airstrikes during the 2022 Russian invasion of Ukraine
War crimes during the 2022 Russian invasion of Ukraine
21st-century mass murder in Ukraine
2022 controversies
History of Donetsk
War crimes in Ukraine